Singlet fission is a spin-allowed process, unique to molecular photophysics, whereby one singlet excited state is converted into two triplet states.  The phenomenon has been observed in molecular crystals, aggregates, disordered thin films, and covalently-linked dimers, where the chromophores are oriented such that the electronic coupling between singlet and the double triplet states is large.  Being spin allowed, the process can occur very rapidly (on a picosecond or femtosecond timescale) and out-compete radiative decay (that generally occurs on a nanosecond timescale) thereby producing two triplets with very high efficiency.  The process is distinct from intersystem crossing, in that singlet fission does not involve a spin flip, but is mediated by two triplets coupled into an overall singlet. It has been proposed that singlet fission in organic photovoltaic devices could improve the photoconversion efficiencies.

History
The process of singlet fission was first introduced to describe the photophysics of anthracene in 1965.  Early studies on the effect of the magnetic field on the fluorescence of crystalline tetracene solidified understanding of singlet fission in polyacenes. 

Acenes, Pentacene and Tetracene in particular, are a prominent candidates for singlet fission.  The energy of the triplet states are smaller than or equal to half of the singlet (S1) state energy, thus satisfying the requirement of S1 ≥ 2T1. Singlet fission in functionalized pentacene compounds has been observed experimentally. Intramolecular singlet fission in covalently linked pentacene and tetracene dimers has also been reported.

The detailed mechanism of the process is unknown.  Particularly, the role of charge transfer states in the singlet fission process is still debated. Typically, the mechanisms for singlet fission are classified into (a) Direct coupling between the molecules and (b) Step-wise one-electron processes involving the charge-transfer states. Intermolecular interactions and the relative orientation of the molecules within the aggregates are known to critically effect the singlet fission efficiencies.

The limited number and structural similarity of chromophores is believed to be the major obstacle to advancing the field for practical applications.  It has been proposed that computational modeling of the diradical character of molecules may serve as a guiding principle for the discovery of new classes of singlet fission chromophores.  Computations allowed to identify carbenes as building blocks for engineering singlet fission molecules.

References

Quantum mechanics
Spectroscopy